Ice & Fire is a 1995 video game from Zombie Studios.

Development
Ice & Fire was developed with the help of Tetris creators Alexey Pajitnov and Vladimir Pokhilko. The game had a marketing budget of $1 million.

Reception

GameSpot gave the game a score of 5 out of 10 stating "This game tests patience and logic, and Doom fans will find the only similarities here are the first-person perspective and the letter 'D' in the name. A tedious puzzle game in action game's clothing."

References

1995 video games
First-person shooters
Rail shooters
Video games about extraterrestrial life
Video games set in outer space